Benedetto Lanza (May 24, 1924, Florence – March 10, 2016, Florence) was an Italian herpetologist and chiropterologist. He published over 500 works, with the first one being published in 1946. He described 68 new taxa. He was Professor of Biology and Director of the Natural History Museum at the Università degli Studi di Firenze.

Eponyms
Lanza is commemorated in the scientific names of a species and a subspecies of reptiles: Chalcides lanzai and Latastia longicaudata lanzai. One bat species is also named after him, the Socotran or Lanza's pipistrelle (Hypsugo lanzai).

References

1924 births
2016 deaths
Italian herpetologists
20th-century Italian zoologists
Scientists from Florence